Make Cars Green (MCG) is a campaign by the Fédération Internationale de l'Automobile (FIA) aimed at reducing the impact of cars on the environment. The campaign consists of advising motorists of methods of reducing carbon dioxide emissions, as well as purchasing environmentally friendlier vehicles.

Campaign

The Make Cars Green campaign was launched at the 2008 World Environment Day, which was held in New Zealand. The event was attended by the FIA Foundation director General David Ward and the World Bank's road safety specialist Tony Bliss, as well as New Zealand Prime Minister Helen Clark. Ward outlined the importance of the campaign, noting:

The basis of the campaign is a ten-point guide for reducing the environmental impact of cars, including checking tyre pressure for optimum efficiency, planning journeys in advance and offsetting carbon emissions. The FIA aims to reach these objectives by working with its member clubs.

In Formula One

As the FIA is the governing body of Formula One, the sport is involved in the campaign. At the 2008 Japanese Grand Prix, tyre supplier Bridgestone provided the teams with green-grooved tyres in order to draw attention to Make Cars Green.

FIA president Max Mosley outlined the sport's commitment to the campaign:

The president of the Japan Automobile Federation, Tetsuo Tanaka, agreed with Mosley, adding:

The FIA and Bridgestone held a press conference before the grand prix where F1 drivers Felipe Massa, Kimi Räikkönen, Lewis Hamilton and Heikki Kovalainen outlined the ways in which they reduce their carbon footprints.

See also

 Fédération Internationale de l'Automobile
 World Environment Day
 2008 Japanese Grand Prix

References

External links
 Make Cars Green official website

Fédération Internationale de l'Automobile
Formula One
Transport and the environment